Tambja sagamiana is a species of colourful sea slug, a dorid nudibranch, a marine gastropod mollusk in the family Polyceridae.

Distribution
This species occurs in the West Pacific Ocean around Japan, Taiwan and  Korea.

Description
Tambja sagamiana is blue with yellow to orange pustule-like spots all over its body. The spots are outlined in black. It has green gills and black rhinophores. The foot is yellow. This animal can reach a total length of at least 110 mm.

References

 Pola M., Cervera J.L. & Gosliner T.M. (2006) Taxonomic revision and phylogenetic analysis of the genus Tambja Burn, 1962 (Mollusca, Nudibranchia, Polyceridae). Zoologica Scripta 35(5):491-530

External links

 Tambja sagamiana page at nudipixel

Polyceridae
Gastropods described in 1955